Cerithiella metula is a species of very small sea snail, a marine gastropod mollusk in the family Newtoniellidae. This species is known from European waters, the Gulf of Maine, the northwestern Atlantic Ocean, and the United Kingdom Exclusive Economic Zone. It was described by Lovén, in 1846. It is a predator, omnivore, and scavenger. Recently there are indications that this gastropod may have featured more primitive version's of the Mantis Shrimp's spring loaded claws.

Description 
The maximum recorded shell length is 11 mm.

Habitat 
Minimum recorded depth is 201 m. Maximum recorded depth is 2915 m.

References

External links
  Serge GOFAS, Ángel A. LUQUE, Joan Daniel OLIVER,José TEMPLADO & Alberto SERRA (2021) - The Mollusca of Galicia Bank (NE Atlantic Ocean); European Journal of Taxonomy 785: 1–114

Newtoniellidae
Gastropods described in 1846